Anaecypris hispanica, the Spanish minnowcarp, is a small species of ray-finned fish species in the family Cyprinidae. It is the only living member of the genus Anaecypris. It is endemic to the Iberian Peninsula and is found in the basin of the Guadiana River in southern Spain and Portugal. Its natural habitats are rivers and intermittent rivers which are shallow, highly oxygenated, have a water temperature of no more than 25 °C and have a coarse stream bed. It is threatened by habitat loss. They grow to a maximum size of 60mm and live for three years.

References

Collares-Pereira, M.J., Cowx, I.G., Rodrigues, J.A., Rogado, L. & da Costa, L.M., 1999. The status of Anaecypris hispanica in Portugal: Problems of conserving a highly endangered Iberian fish. Biological Conservation 88, 207-212. 

Leuciscinae
Endemic fish of the Iberian Peninsula
Fish described in 1866
Taxonomy articles created by Polbot